Rye railway station is a Grade II listed station, serving Rye, East Sussex, England. The station is a passing place between two single track sections.

A station at Rye was first planned in the early 1840s, though on a different route to what was opened. It was built by the South Eastern Railway as the central station on the line from Hastings to Ashford, opening in 1851. Despite recommendation for closure in the 1963 Beeching Report, it has remained open because of poor quality road connections. The station building was designed by William Tress; it was Grade II listed in 1980, while an 1894 signal box was listed in 2013.

Location
The station is to the north of the town centre, between two level crossings. There are two platforms, one for trains to Ashford and the other for Hastings. The staggered platforms are linked by footbridge. There is a waiting room on Platform 2 (Hastings bound).

Stagecoach South East bus routes 70, 100, 101, 102, 292, 293, 312, 313, 326, 342 and 553 serve the station.

History

Background

A station at Rye was proposed in April 1840, when the Tenterden, Rye & Hastings Branch Railway planned a line from the South Eastern Main Line near Smarden to Hastings via Tenterden and Rye. At the time, harbour duties were not charged at Rye, making it a suitable port for goods traffic. The following year, it was estimated a single-track line from the South Eastern Main Line to Hastings via Rye could be built for £250,000 (£ in ). The company attempted to negotiate construction with the South Eastern Railway (SER), who thought the route was a poor choice and preferred to reach Hastings from  via .

In 1844, the SER became concerned that the Brighton, Lewes & Hastings Railway (BLHR) would extend its line beyond Hastings to Rye and Ashford. A compromise was reached whereby the BLHR was granted permission to build the line with an option for the SER to take over if necessary. The River Rother to the east of Rye was still navigable and required a moveable crossing. Peter W. Barlow designed a swing-bridge to carry the line over the river. Both this bridge and the one over the River Tillingham to the west required approach ramps on an otherwise flat stretch of railway.

The SER's contract stipulated that the company should contribute £10,000 (£ as of ) towards improving Rye Harbour, and Robert Stephenson recommended a branch line for goods traffic. This was constructed west of the station and the River Tillingham, running to the harbour pier on the opposite side of the river to the town. The branch line never carried passengers and has been demolished.

Opening
The first train to Rye ran on 28 October 1850, before the line had been fully completed. A coal stage opened in 1854, and new goods sidings were added in 1874.

In 1859, a proposal was made to link Rye with Folkestone via Lydd and Dymchurch. The SER declined to finance the line. The scheme was cancelled two years later.

Post-opening

The swing bridge to the east of the station over the River Rother was replaced by a fixed bridge in 1903. A footbridge was installed across the staggered platforms at the station in 1960, in preparation for the Kent electrification scheme Phase 2 of the British Railways Modernisation Plan, which provisionally included the line through Rye.

The line was recommended to be closed in the 1963 Beeching Report, but because of poor road connections, it remained open along with its stations. The prolonged threat of closure left the station unmodernised and gaslit well into the 1970s. On 1 October 1979, the Marshlink line either side of Rye was reduced to single track, leaving a passing loop at the station. Though done for economic reasons, the decision has been criticised as it has created bottlenecks.

The station was Grade II listed in April 1980 owing to its "special architectural or historic interest". The goods shed, which was closed in 1963, was demolished in 1984.

Buildings

Construction of the station building began in 1847. It was designed by William Tress in symmetric Italianate style of two storeys with an attic in red brick with a slate roof and set of gateless gate pillars. As Rye was planned to be a more significant stop than Appledore or Winchelsea, it was designed to be bigger than those. Tress also designed a goods shed in a similar style, sited alongside the main station building.

Several SER stations were retrofitted with signals on the line in the early 1890s. The box at Rye was built in 1894 using a Saxby & Farmer Type 12 design. It retains its original 1888 pattern Duplex frame, though the original 30-lever manual signals were replaced by coloured lights on 1 October 1979. The ground floor is constructed of Flemish bond brown brick, the first floor is made of timber with weatherboard cladding and it has a slate roof. The signal box was Grade II listed in 2013 as it is one of only two of its type still standing in good condition. In 2019, it was repainted and refurbished.

Services

All services at Rye are operated by Southern using  DMUs.

The typical off-peak service in trains per hour is:
 1 tph to  via 
 1 tph to 

Previously, westbound trains ran as an express service to  although this was changed to a stopping service to Eastbourne in the May 2018 timetable change.

In 2018, Network Rail announced a fast service from St Pancras to Hastings would stop at Rye, and could be implemented by 2024. However, the date remains uncertain despite support from Amber Rudd, a former Member of Parliament for Hastings and Rye.

References
Citations

Sources

External links

Railway stations in East Sussex
Grade II listed railway stations
DfT Category E stations
Former South Eastern Railway (UK) stations
Railway stations in Great Britain opened in 1851
Railway stations served by Govia Thameslink Railway
1851 establishments in England
Rother District